Pilumnoididae is a family of crabs containing the genera Pilumnoides, with several species, and the monotypic Setozius.

References

Crabs
Decapod families